Army Operational Command, short "HOK", was the Danish Army's top authority. It is a Level.II command authority, directly under the Defence Command. HOK was formed on 1 January 1991.

The origin of HOK can be traced back to 1808, with the forming of the General staff. Initially located in Aarhus, 1 August 1993 it had its headquarters in Karup, Denmark.

Due to the recent Defence agreement 2005-2009 many changes are currently in the process of being implemented, so the following subordinated list might not be fully complete or fully accurate. Directly subordinated is the following Level.III authorities.

Subordinated Level.III authorities
 Danish Division (DDIV)
 1.Brigade
 2.Brigade
 Danish Operative Logistical Group (DANOPLOG)
 Local defence region - Bornholm Defence (LFR BV)
 Jægerkorpset (JGK)

Regiments
 Den Kongelige Livgarde (LG)
 Jydske Dragonregiment (JDR)
 Gardehusarregimentet (GHR)
 Ingeniørregimentet (IGR)
 Telegrafregimentet (TGR)
 Trænregimentet (TRR)
 Danske Artilleriregiment (DAR)

Schools
 Army Officers Academy (HO)
 Army Combat School (HKS)
 Army Artillery School (HILS)
 Army Engineer & ABC School (HIAS)
 Army Signal School
 Army Logistical School (HLS)
 Army Sergeant School (HSGS)

Camps
 Borrislejren
 Oksbøllejren
 Jægersprislejren

Recent disbanded structures (since 2000)
 1.Jutland Brigade (1.JBDE) 1961-2004
 2.Jutland Brigade (2.JBDE) 1961-1996
 3.Jutland Brigade (3.JBDE) 1961-2004
 1.Zealand Brigade (1.SBDE) 1961-2004
 2.Zealand Brigade (2.SBDE) 1961-1994
 3.Zealand Brigade (3.SBDE) 1961-1974
 Danish International Brigade (DIB) 1994-2005
 1.Zealand Combat group(1.SKG) 1983-1996
 2.Zealand Combat group(2.SKG) 1983-2000
 3.Zealand Combat group(3.SKG) 1983-1996
 4.Zealand Combat group(4.SKG) 1983-1990
 Zealand Combat group(SKG) 2000-2004
 Jutland Combat group (JKG) 1983-2004
 4.Combat group (4.KG) 1991-1996
 Danish Division Combat group 2000-2004
 Nørrejyske Artilleriregiment (NJAR)
 Sønderjydske Artilleriregiment (SJAR)
 Dronningens Livregiment (DRLR)
 Slesvigske Fodregiment (SLFR)
 Danske Livregiment (DLR)
 Sjællandske Livregiment (SLR)
 Prinsens Livregiment (PLR)
 Kongens Artilleriregiment (KAR)
 Dronningens Artilleriregiment (DAR)
 Danish International Logistical Center (DANILOG)
 Danske Artilleriregiment (DAR)

Previous disbanded structures (since 1995)
 Jutland Division (JDIV)
 2.Zealand Brigade (2.JBDE)
 2.Jutland Brigade (2.JBDE)
 Sjællandske Ingeniørregiment
 Jyske Ingeniørregiment
 Sjællandske Trænregiment
 Jyske Trænregiment

External links

Military units and formations of Denmark